Ron Goodwin may refer to:

 Ronald Alfred "Ron" Goodwin, an English composer and conductor
 Ron Goodwin,  an American football player